George Bush judicial appointment controversies may refer to:

George H. W. Bush judicial appointment controversies, with nominations made by George H. W. Bush, the 41st president of the United States
George W. Bush judicial appointment controversies, with nominations made by George W. Bush, the 43rd president of the United States

See also
George Bush (disambiguation)